"Talking to the Universe" is a song by Yoko Ono, originally released in 1995 on the album Rising.

Chart performance
The song became Yoko Ono's seventh consecutive number-one hit on the Billboard Hot Dance Club Songs chart and her ninth number-one hit overall.

Track list
Talking to the Universe – single
"Talking to the Universe" (Ralphi Rosario vocal mix) – 7:35
"Talking to the Universe" (Ralphi Rosario dub mix) – 7:20

Talking to the Universe Remixes
"Talking to the Universe" (Ralphi Rosario vocal mix) – 7:37
"Talking to the Universe" (Ralphi Rosario dub mix) – 7:22
"Talking to the Universe" (Chris the Greek club mix) – 7:58
"Talking to the Universe" (Chris the Greek dub mix) – 8:41
"Talking to the Universe" (Chris the Greek radio edit) – 3:37
"Talking to the Universe" (The Perry Twins mix) – 7:47
"Talking to the Universe" (Tony Marinos club mix) – 6:51
"Talking to the Universe" (Tony Marinos dub mix) – 6:51

Talking to the Universe Remixes Part 2
"Talking to the Universe" (Yiannis Sympan mix) – 7:14
"Talking to the Universe" (Yiannis Kosmos dub mix) – 6:42
"Talking to the Universe" (Yiannis Sympan radio edit) – 3:38
"Talking to the Universe" (Richard Morel vocal mix) – 8:07
"Talking to the Universe" (Richard Morel dub) – 7:52
"Talking to the Universe" (Richard Morel radio edit) – 4:33
"Talking to the Universe" (Chris Cox club mix) – 7:19
"Talking to the Universe" (Chris Cox dub) – 6:49
"Talking to the Universe" (Chris Cox radio edit) – 3:34
"Talking to the Universe" (Juan Maclean Acid Attack mix) – 5:13
"Talking to the Universe" (Juan Maclean Acid dub mix) – 7:07

Talking to the Universe Remixes Part 3
"Talking to the Universe" (Dave Aude club mix) – 6:37
"Talking to the Universe" (Dave Aude dub mix) – 6:07
"Talking to the Universe" (Dave Aude radio edit) – 3:50
"Talking to the Universe" (Dave Aude instrumental) – 6:37
"Talking to the Universe" (Eddie Amador remix) – 6:32
"Talking to the Universe" (Eddie Amador Listen To Yoko dub) – 6:47
"Talking to the Universe" (Yoko Ono She Didn't Harlum Muzip dub) – 6:11
"Talking to the Universe" (Yoko Ono She Didn't Harlum Muzip Dubstrumental) – 6:11

Charts

Weekly charts

Year-end charts

See also
 List of number-one dance singles of 2011 (U.S.)

References

2011 singles
Yoko Ono songs
Songs written by Yoko Ono
Song recordings produced by Yoko Ono
1995 songs
Capitol Records singles